Blasco de Grañén (c. 1400, Zaragoza – October 1459, Zaragoza) (known as: "Master of Lanaja") was a Gothic painter active in Aragon from 1422. He became the appointed painter to Juan II of Aragon. His notable assistant, among others, was Pedro García de Benavarre, with whom he made the altarpieces for the monastery of San Pedro de Siresa in 1445.

Grañén was a follower of Juan de Leví. In 1435, he made the altarpiece for the Basilica of Our Lady of the Pillar in Zaragoza. Two years later he created an altarpiece for the altar of Santiago at the Iglesia de Santa María la Mayor in Épila. He began the altarpiece for the Church of San Salvador in Ejea de los Caballeros in 1440 but it was unfinished at the time of his death; his nephew, Martín de Soria, completed it. He died in October 1459, leaving his widow, Dona Blanca de Tena.

References

 LACARRA DUCAY, María Carmen & MARCOS, Angel, Joyas de un patrimonio. Retablo de San Salvador. Ejea de los Caballeros, Zaragoza, Diputación de Zaragoza; Centro de Estudios de las Cinco Villas, 1991. Catálogo de la exposición. (in Spanish)
 MORTE GARCÍA, Carmen (dir.) & Margarita Castillo Montolar (coord.), El esplendor del Renacimiento en Aragón, Zaragoza, Gobierno de Aragón; Museo de Bellas Artes de Bilbao; Generalitat Valenciana, 2009. . Catálogo de la Exposición. Guía abreviada. (in Spanish)
LACARRA DUCAY, María Carmen, Blasco de Grañén, pintor de retablos (1422-1459), Zaragoza, Institución "Fernando el Católico", 2004. (in Spanish)

1400 births
1459 deaths
People from Zaragoza
Gothic painters
15th-century Spanish painters
Spanish male painters